Marcel Goc (born 24 August 1983) is a German former professional ice hockey player.

Goc's father Josef played hockey in his native Czechoslovakia, he has two brothers who also play professional hockey. His older brother Sascha has played for Team Germany as well. His younger brother Nikolai also previously played for Adler Mannheim and Team Germany.

Goc saw action in 699 NHL contests, played 388 games in the DEL and won 112 caps for the German men's national team. He won a silver medal at the 2018 Olympic Games.

Playing career
As a youth, Goc played in the 1996 and 1997 Quebec International Pee-Wee Hockey Tournaments with a team from Baden-Württemberg.

Goc was drafted in the first round, 20th overall by the Sharks in the 2001 NHL Entry Draft, though he remained in Germany until 2003. He spent all of the 2003–04 season with the Cleveland Barons, the Sharks' then minor league affiliate, but joined the Sharks during the 2004 playoffs. He holds the franchise record in Cleveland for longest assist streak (7 games).

In his first NHL game, Game 5 of the Western Conference Quarterfinals against the St. Louis Blues, Goc assisted on the series-clinching goal by deflecting the puck away from Blues goaltender Chris Osgood and right to Mark Smith. Then, in his second game, Game 6 of the Western Conference Semifinals against the Colorado Avalanche, he scored the series-clinching goal by deflecting a shot past Avalanche goaltender David Aebischer.

On 20 August 2009, Goc signed a one-year $550,000 two-way contract with the Nashville Predators and after a very successful first half of the 2009–10 season, he was rewarded with a $775,000 one-year contract extension.

Goc signed a three-year contract as a free agent worth $5.1 million with the Florida Panthers on 1 July 2011. On 11 October 2011, Goc scored his first goal with the Panthers against the Pittsburgh Penguins.

On 5 March 2014, Goc was traded to the Pittsburgh Penguins for a 3rd and a 5th round pick. As a free agent Goc re-signed with the Penguins to a $1.2 million contract.

In the following 2014–15 season, on 22 October 2014, in a 5–3 loss to the Philadelphia Flyers, Goc scored his first goal with the Penguins. After 43 games with the Penguins on 27 January 2015, Goc was traded to the St. Louis Blues in exchange for Maxim Lapierre.

On September 1, 2015, as a free agent, Goc signalled the end of his NHL career in returning to Germany to sign a five-year contract with reigning Champions, Adler Mannheim of the DEL. In January 2017, he suffered a torn ACL and had to undergo surgery. Goc announced his retirement as a player in March 2020, but stayed with the Mannheim club, joining the coaching staff as a skills and development coach.

International play
Goc has played for Team Germany in numerous tournaments, including the 2000 (as a sixteen-year-old) and 2001 World Junior Championships, the 2001 U18 Championships, the 2002 World Junior tournament, the 2003 Swiss Cup, eight World Championships, the 2006, 2010 and 2018 Winter Olympics. In 2018, he led Germany to a silver medal, serving as the team captain during the tournament. The NHL didn't release its players for the tournament, but Goc was able to participate as he was playing professionally in Germany. His best result at a World Championships was a fourth place finish in 2010.

Touted for his defensive prowess and faceoff skills, Goc was a fixture on Team Germany for 18 years. In April 2018, he announced the end of his international career after 112 caps, 17 goals and 18 assists for Germany.

Career statistics

Regular season and playoffs

International

Awards and honours

References

External links
 
 Marcel Goc Official website

1983 births
Living people
Adler Mannheim players
Cleveland Barons (2001–2006) players
Florida Panthers players
German ice hockey centres
Ice hockey players at the 2006 Winter Olympics
Ice hockey players at the 2010 Winter Olympics
Ice hockey players at the 2018 Winter Olympics
Medalists at the 2018 Winter Olympics
Nashville Predators players
National Hockey League first-round draft picks
Olympic ice hockey players of Germany
Olympic medalists in ice hockey
Olympic silver medalists for Germany
People from Calw
Sportspeople from Karlsruhe (region)
Pittsburgh Penguins players
St. Louis Blues players
San Jose Sharks draft picks
San Jose Sharks players
Schwenninger Wild Wings players
German people of Czech descent
German expatriate ice hockey people
Expatriate ice hockey players in the United States
German expatriate sportspeople in the United States